Big Star is an American rock band.

Big Star may also refer to:

Big Star, a South Korean band
Big Star Markets, a defunct American grocery store chain
Big Star, a horse that Nick Skelton rode yo gold medals in the 2012 and 2016 Summer Olympics
Big Star Records, a retail music chain that was based in Adelaide, South Australia
Big Star, a song from Ocean Colour Scene's third album, Marchin' Already
"Big Star" (Kenny Chesney song), a 2003 single by Kenny Chesney
Big Star, a 2000 single by Adam Gregory off of his debut album The Way I'm Made. 
Big Star, a song from Lorde's 2021 album Solar Power